Jean Antoine Coquebert de Montbret (1753, Paris- 6 April 1825) was a French entomologist.
He wrote Illustratio iconographica insectorum quae in musaeis parisinis observavit et in lucem edidit Joh. Christ. Fabricius, praemissis ejusdem descriptionibus; accedunt species plurimae, vel minus aut nondum cognitae, Paris: P. Didot, 1799-1804 an illustrated work on insect specimens in the Museum d'Histoire Naturelle in Paris. The insects appear as inside an insect box.

References
Laboulais-Lesage, Isabelle,1999 Lectures et pratiques de l’espace. L’itinéraire de Coquebert de Montbret, savant et grand commis de l’État Paris, Honoré Champion.

External links
Zoologica Göttingen State and University Library Digitised Illustratio iconographica insectorum ...

French entomologists
1753 births
1825 deaths
National Museum of Natural History (France) people